Edoardo Vesentini (31 May 1928 – 28 March 2020) was an Italian mathematician and politician who introduced the Andreotti–Vesentini theorem. He was awarded the Caccioppoli Prize in 1962.

Vasentini was born in Rome, and died on 28 March 2020, aged 91.

References
.

Premio Caccioppoli 1962 a Edoardo Vesentini

1928 births
2020 deaths
20th-century Italian mathematicians
21st-century Italian mathematicians
Politicians from Rome
Complex analysts
Mathematical analysts
Foreign Members of the Russian Academy of Sciences
Academic staff of the University of Pisa
Academic staff of the Scuola Normale Superiore di Pisa